Sofie Natalie Skoog (born June 7, 1990) is a Swedish high jumper. She represented her nation Sweden at the 2015 IAAF World Championships, and at the 2016 Summer Olympics, finishing seventh in the final round of the women's high jump. Skoog currently trains as a member of the track and field squad for IF Göta Karlstad, under the tutelage of her coach Stefan Holm, a former high jumper and Athens 2004 champion.

Skoog competed for Sweden, along with her fellow countrywoman Erika Kinsey, in the women's high jump at the 2016 Summer Olympics in Rio de Janeiro. Six months before her maiden Games, she jumped a height of 1.94 m to attain the IAAF Olympic entry standard by just a single centimetre at the Nordic Championships in Växjö. Having entered the final round with a personal best of 1.94 m set at the qualifying phase, Skoog managed to jump easily into the competition at 1.88, and then spent two attempts to get over 1.93 m. Unable to trump the 1.97-metre mark after three attempts, Skoog ended her Olympic campaign in a two-way tie with Germany's Marie-Laurence Jungfleisch for seventh place.

Competition record

References

External links
 
 

Swedish female high jumpers
Living people
People from Hagfors Municipality
1993 births
World Athletics Championships athletes for Sweden
Athletes (track and field) at the 2016 Summer Olympics
Olympic athletes of Sweden
Competitors at the 2013 Summer Universiade
Sportspeople from Värmland County